Massachusetts v. Mellon, 262 U.S. 447 (1923), was a United States Supreme Court case in which the Court rejected the concept of taxpayer standing. The case was consolidated with Frothingham v. Mellon. The plaintiffs in the cases, Frothingham and Massachusetts, sought to prevent certain federal government expenditures which they considered to violate the Tenth Amendment.  The court rejected the suits on the basis that neither plaintiff suffered particularized harm, writing:

We have no power per se to review and annul acts of Congress on the ground that they are unconstitutional. The question may be considered only when the justification for some direct injury suffered or threatened, presenting a justiciable issue, is made to rest upon such an act. ... The party who invokes the power must be able to show not only that the statute is invalid but that he has sustained or is immediately in danger of sustaining some direct injury as the result of its enforcement, and not merely that he suffers in some indefinite way in common with people generally.

This case is considered the beginning of the doctrine of standing. Prior to it the doctrine was that all persons had a right to pursue a private prosecution of a public right.

The Warren Court would later carve out an exception to this rule in Flast v. Cohen, but later cases have confirmed that Flast is an exceedingly limited exception to Frothingham'''s general rule (see Valley Forge Christian College v. Americans United for Separation of Church and State and Hein v. Freedom From Religion Foundation'').

References

External links
 
 

United States Constitution Article Three case law
United States Supreme Court cases
1923 in United States case law
United States standing case law
Overruled United States Supreme Court decisions
United States Supreme Court cases of the Taft Court